Nervous & Weird is an EP by American rock band Everclear, released in 1993. It was the first official release by the band. In addition to the CD, there was also a 7" release, which featured the title track on side A and "Electra Made Me Blind" on side B.

Song information
"Nervous and Weird" later appeared on their first album, World of Noise. "Connection" is a Rolling Stones cover. "Slow Motion Genius" has musical similarities to "Your Genius Hands," also on World of Noise. "Electra Made Me Blind" was later re-recorded for Sparkle and Fade.

Track listing
All songs by Art Alexakis and Everclear except where noted.
"Nervous and Weird" – 2:32
"Lame" – 2:07
"Drunk Again" – 3:03
"Connection" (Mick Jagger/Keith Richards) – 2:14
"Electra Made Me Blind" – 4:06
"Slow Motion Genius" – 1:26

Members
Art Alexakis – Guitar, Vocals
Craig Montoya – Bass
Scott Cuthbert – drums

References 

Everclear (band) EPs
1993 EPs
1993 debut albums
Albums produced by Art Alexakis